Lieutenant-Colonel Sir Elliott Lees, 1st Baronet, DSO (23 October 1860 – 16 October 1908), was a British Conservative Party politician.

Lees was educated at Eton and Christ Church, Oxford.

Lees was elected to the House of Commons for Oldham in 1886, a seat he held until 1892, and later represented Birkenhead from 1894 to 1906.

In 1897 he was created a Baronet, of South Lytchett Manor in Lytchett Minster in the County of Dorset.

Lees was an officer in the Dorsetshire Yeomanry. He volunteered for active service during the Second Boer War, and on 24 February 1900 was appointed a captain of the 26th (Dorsetshire) Company serving in the 7th Battalion, Imperial Yeomanry, which left England for South Africa on the SS Manchester Merchant in early March. He was mentioned in despatches and awarded the Distinguished Service Order (DSO) in November 1900. After his return to the United Kingdom he was appointed a supernumerary major of the regiment in January 1902.

Lees married Florence Keith, daughter of Patrick Keith, in 1882. He died in October 1908, aged 47, and was succeeded in the baronetcy by his eldest son Thomas. Lady Lees died in 1917.

Notes

References 
Kidd, Charles, Williamson, David (editors). Debrett's Peerage and Baronetage (1990 edition). New York: St Martin's Press, 1990.

External links 
 

1860 births
1908 deaths
Baronets in the Baronetage of the United Kingdom
Conservative Party (UK) MPs for English constituencies
UK MPs 1886–1892
UK MPs 1892–1895
UK MPs 1895–1900
UK MPs 1900–1906
Politics of the Metropolitan Borough of Oldham
Queen's Own Dorset Yeomanry officers
British military personnel of the Second Boer War
People educated at Eton College
Alumni of Christ Church, Oxford